C-Repeat Binding Factors (CBFs) are transcription factors in plants involved in response to low temperature.  
Also known as Dehydration Response Element Binding factors (DREBs), they are a subfamily of AP2 DNA binding domain transcription factors.

References 
 Stockinger, E. J., Gilmour, S. J. & Thomashow, M.F. (1997) Proc. Natl. Acad. Sci. USA 94, 1035–1040
 Liu, Q., Kasuga, M., Sakuma, Y., Abe, H., Miura, S., Yamaguchi-Shinozaki, K. & Shinozaki, K. (1998) Plant Cell 10, 1391–1406
 Jaglo-Ottosen, K. R., Gilmour, S. J., Zarka, D. G., Schabenberger, O. & Thomashow, M. F. (1998) Science 280, 104–106

Transcription factors